Peter Friedrich Röding (17 June 1767 – 8 June 1846) was a German malacologist who lived in Hamburg. Very little is known about this naturalist.

Many of Röding's descriptions (often simply a German rendition of the Latin binomial name) are of species which were first named by earlier authors such as Johann Hieronymus Chemnitz, Friedrich Wilhelm Martini and Martin Lister. Röding's references to pre-existing descriptions and figures make these names also valid, since they are unequivocally recognizable, and were (after Röding) subsequently adopted by many later authors.

Museum Boltenianum 
He was the principal author of a 1798 catalogue of an important mollusc collection. The catalogue was entitled Museum Boltenianum sive catalogus cimeliorum e tribus regnis naturæ quæ olim collegerat Joa. Fried Bolten, M. D. p. d. per XL. annos proto physicus Hamburgensis. Pars secunda continens conchylia sive testacea univalvia, bivalvia &  multivalvia and was published in Hamburg. This was in fact a sale catalogue, and it was ignored as a taxonomic work until William Healey Dall recognized that it introduced new valid taxa, though with long names and short descriptions. Thus Röding is credited with naming many taxa.

Museum Boltenianum sive Catalogus…, the sale catalogue, is a rare book.

References

External links 
 William Healey Dall, An Index to the Museum Boltenianum, Washington, 1915
 Dictionnaire de malacologie de la Société belge de malacologie (in French)
 Photocopy of 2005 reprint of Museum Boltenianum...
 Taxa described as new in Röding, P. F. 1798

1767 births
1846 deaths
Conchologists
German malacologists
Teuthologists